JoJo is the debut studio album by American singer JoJo, released on June 22, 2004, by Da Family Entertainment, Blackground Records, and Universal Records. Incorporating pop and R&B, JoJo was influenced by Ella Fitzgerald, Bobby Brown, and Aretha Franklin, amongst other of JoJo's idols. A special edition of the album featuring three bonus tracks, was released simultaneously alongside the 14-track standard edition, which was only made available in some European and Oceanian countries. JoJo co-wrote three out of the 17 tracks on the album.

While recording the album, JoJo worked with many producers, such as Brian Alexander Morgan, Soulshock and Karlin, Vincent Herbert, Mike City, Balewa Muhammad, Tre Black, Bink!, Kwamé "K1 Mill" and The Underdogs as well as others, to handle production for the album. JoJo recorded a number of songs for the album over an eight-month period. Amongst those included is a cover of R&B group SWV's 1993 song "Weak", in addition to one collaboration with Bow Wow, who features on the single release version of "Baby It's You". Occasionally, the album dips into other genres such as hip hop and soul music.

The album was preceded by the release of JoJo's debut single, "Leave (Get Out)", which achieved critical and commercial success worldwide. In the United States, the single peaked inside the top 20 of the Billboard Hot 100, and also topped the Pop 100 chart, making her the youngest artist in history to do so. In the United Kingdom, the single also performed well, reaching number two. Follow-up single "Baby It's You" featured rapper Bow Wow and became JoJo's second top-40 entry in the United States. In the United Kingdom, the song became her second top-10 single, peaking at number eight. The third and final single, "Not That Kinda Girl", failed to chart in the United States, while charting in Australia and Germany.

JoJo was promoted mainly through live, televised performances, appearing on shows such as On Air with Ryan Seacrest as well as performing at the 2004 Kid's Choice Awards. Aside from network appearances, JoJo also embarked on The Cingular Buddy Bash Tour with other artists, and as the opening act on the European leg of Usher's Truth Tour. The album debuted and peaked at number four on the US Billboard 200, selling 95,000 copies in its first week. It was certified platinum by the Recording Industry Association of America (RIAA) on November 15, 2004, denoting US sales in excess of one million copies. The album also proved to be a success elsewhere. In the United Kingdom and Germany, the album has been certified gold, while in Canada, the album received a platinum certification. The album has sold over three million copies worldwide.

Re-recorded versions of JoJo and The High Road were released on December 21, 2018.

On August 5, 2021, Blackground Records announced on Twitter that the original versions of JoJo and The High Road would be available on streaming services and digital platforms on September 24, 2021.

Background
As a child, JoJo listened as her mother practiced hymns. She started singing when she was two years and three months old by imitating, to R&B, jazz, and soul tunes. On the A&E show Child Stars III: Teen Rockers, her mother claimed that JoJo had a borderline genius IQ. As a child, JoJo enjoyed attending Native American festivals and acted locally in professional theaters.

At age seven, JoJo appeared on the television show Kids Say the Darnedest Things: On the Road in Boston with American comedian and actor Bill Cosby and she sang a song from singer Cher. After auditioning in the television show Destination Stardom, JoJo sang Aretha Franklin's songs "Respect" and "Chain of Fools". Soon after, The Oprah Winfrey Show contacted her, inviting her to perform. She performed on Maury, on one of the frequent "kids-with-talent" episodes, as well as many others. Reminiscing, she has stated that "when it came to performing, I just had no fear".

At the age of six, JoJo was offered a record deal, but her mother turned it down because she believed JoJo was too young for a music career. After appearing on talk shows and the McDonald's Gospel Fest performing Whitney Houston's "I Believe in You and Me" and competing on the television show America's Most Talented Kids, but did not win the show and lost to Diana DeGarmo. Record producer Vincent Herbert contacted her and asked her to audition for Blackground Records. During her audition for Barry Hankerson, Hankerson told her that the spirit of his niece, the late singer Aaliyah, had brought her to him. She was signed to the label, and had recording sessions with famed producers like The Underdogs and Soulshock and Karlin.

JoJo's live demo, Joanna Levesque, recorded in 2001, features covers of soul and R&B songs, including Wilson Pickett's "Mustang Sally" (1966), Etta James' "It Ain't Always What You Do (It's Who You Let See You Do It)" (1989), Aretha Franklin's "Chain of Fools" (1968) and "The House That Jack Built" (1969), The Moonglows' "See Saw" (1956), Stevie Wonder's "Superstition" (1972), and The Temptations' "Shakey Ground" (1975). In 2003, at age 12, JoJo signed with Blackground Records and Da Family and begin working with some producers on her first album.

Composition

The music found on JoJo is primarily pop and R&B. During an interview about the album's composition, JoJo stated, "I wrote three songs on the album. I am not the [kind of] person who sings something that I have no reference point to. I feel like I am a real artist and I want to be able to feel what I am singing about. So when I sing, "Leave (Get Out)," I have been through that. I think it is just a new generation, whether people are ready for it or not. Teenagers are dating. They go through things and that is really what it is about." Many have noted that the album is influenced mainly by R&B tracks. On her influences for the album, JoJo has listed many celebrities. During one interview, she stated, "I really was, I had no idea what it was. I was raised in a mostly white neighborhood. I was this little white girl jamming out to Ella Fitzgerald and Bobby Brown. I don't know what kind of stuff I was on!" During a separate interview, JoJo stated, "Well, I listened to everyone from Aretha Franklin to Bob Seager, to the Beatles, but I have to say that my mom is probably my biggest influence. She really has a great voice." JoJo has also listed singer Beyoncé as a major influence, stating, "I think she is the perfect example of a strong woman and just a talented person. She's a songwriter, she's a dancer and she's an incredible singer and I don't think anyone can touch her right now."

The first track on the album, "Breezy" is an up-tempo hip hop track that speaks of JoJo's relationship with a boy, and how he calls her "Breezy". The lyrics are more spoken than sung by JoJo, as the song has a different feel than the rest of the album. "Baby It's You" is the second track on the album, as well as the second single. The song is an up-tempo R&B song that speaks of JoJo not wanting the luxuries and perks of dating someone, and all she wants is them. "Not That Kinda Girl", the album's third single, also serves as the third song. The song sees JoJo comparing herself to other girls, and telling a boy that she's "not that kinda girl", and has true feelings for him. "The Happy Song" is the fourth song on the album. The up-tempo R&B influenced track sees JoJo speaking of how happy a boy makes her feel, and she thinks he might be the one. "Homeboy" is the fifth song on the album, and is more of a hip hop influenced track. The track speaks of how JoJo's feelings have changed for a boy she grew up with. The sixth song on the album is the urban "City Lights". It was inspired lyrically by JoJo's love of Beat Generation culture and named after San Francisco Beat landmark City Lights Bookstore. Lines such as "I feel like I'm on medication" and "I can see the stars/expensive cars on the boulevard" were inspired by the Jack Kerouac novel On the Road. "Leave (Get Out)" is the seventh track on the album, as well as the lead single. The single was met positively by critics, and was majorly successful on music charts worldwide, reaching the top 10 in 11 different countries, including the United States, Australia and the United Kingdom.

The eighth song on the album is "Use My Shoulder", an R&B ballad that lyrically speaks of JoJo trying to cheer up her boyfriend. "Never Say Goodbye" is a pop ballad, that lyrically speaks of JoJo being glad to have someone in her life, and how she "never wants to say goodbye" to him. "Weak" is the 10th track on the album, and is a cover of the 1992 song by SWV. "Keep On Keepin' On" is the 11th song on the album, and is a mid-tempo R&B song that talks of never giving up when you are in dire straits. It is autobiographical and deals with the time JoJo and her mom were living humbly in a small apartment, being jealous of her rich friends, and asking God why. The 12th track on the album is "Sunshine" and speaks of how someone is like an angel to her and makes all her dreams come true. "Yes or No", the 13th song on the album, is more uptempo and hip hop than the rest of the album, and lyrically talks of JoJo questioning a guy to see if he is ready to handle a girl like her. The final track on the album is "Fairy Tales", a pop ballad that lyrically speaks of how JoJo feels she may not be able to love again after the pain her ex has caused her. The second verse interpolates the nursery rhyme "Twinkle, Twinkle, Little Star".

Release

Singles
The album's lead single, "Leave (Get Out)", was released on February 24, 2004, as a physical copy and for radio airplay. The song became an instant success for JoJo, reaching the top 10 in 11 different countries. In the United States, the single peaked at number 12 on the Billboard Hot 100 and topped the Mainstream Top 40 chart. The single was even more successful internationally, peaking at number two on the UK Singles Chart and on the European Hot 100 Singles, as well as in Australia and New Zealand. It also reached the top five in Belgium, Ireland, the Netherlands, and Switzerland, and the top 10 in Germany and Italy. The accompanying music video, directed by Erik White, takes place in a high school. JoJo is seen with friends and dancing with cheerleading girls. The video was nominated for Best New Artist at the 2004 MTV Video Music Awards, which made JoJo become the youngest MTV Video Music Award nominee.

"Baby It's You" was released as the album's second single on September 6, 2004. The album version of the song is performed by JoJo herself, while the version released as a single features Bow Wow. Although it failed to match the success of its predecessor, the song was successful in many countries. In the United States, the single became her second top-40 entry on the Billboard Hot 100, peaking at number 22. The single's highest peak position was at number three in New Zealand, becoming her second single to chart that high. In the United Kingdom, the single also became her second top-10 entry, reaching a peak of number eight. The single also had similar chart success in countries such as Australia, Austria, Belgium, and Denmark.

"Not That Kinda Girl" was released as the album's third and final single on February 15, 2005. The single received a limited release, only receiving minimal airplay in the United States. Due to lack of a physical CD in many countries, the single was a commercial failure. It did, however, manage to chart at number 52 in Australia and number 85 in Germany. The music video was directed by the team of Eric Williams and Randy Marshall, known as Fat Cats, and was shot in Los Angeles. It premiered on MTV's Total Request Live on March 24, 2005. It spent only four days on the countdown and did not climb higher than number eight.

Promotion
JoJo promoted the album mainly through live performances. During 2004 and 2005, JoJo performed at many televised appearances as well as extensive touring with other artist. JoJo performed "Leave (Get Out)" at the 2004 Kids' Choice Awards and on the television shows On Air with Ryan Seacrest and Top of the Pops. She performed the song live for Yahoo! Music, which was posted on their official website. JoJo also performed several songs from the album—including "Leave (Get Out)", "Baby It's You" and "This Time"—on Sessions@AOL, and a digital EP was released to promote the performances. "Leave (Get Out)" was performed yet again on the French television show Hit Machine, where JoJo performed with back up dancers dressed similarly to high school students.

Before the album's release, JoJo embarked on her first ever tour, the Cingular Buddy Bash with pop rock singer Fefe Dobson, hip hop duo Young Gunz and rap metal band Zebrahead. The tour stopped at nine malls, beginning at Atlanta's Northlake Mall and ending at South Shore Plaza. That year, she was requested by First Lady Laura Bush to perform at the 2004 Christmas in Washington special, broadcast by TNT and hosted by Dr. Phil and his wife Robin McGraw. In 2005, JoJo and an all-star lineup participated in the charity single "Come Together Now", to benefit victims of two recent disasters; the 2004 Asian tsunami and Hurricane Katrina a year later. Also in 2005 JoJo hosted and performed at the Hope Rocks concert benefiting City of Hope National Medical Center and co-hosted the 2006 TV Guide Channel's countdown to the Grammy Awards.

Critical reception

JoJo received generally mixed reviews from music critics. Entertainment Weekly praised the album, stating, "Apparently, the army of urban producers (Soulshock & Karlin, the Underdogs, Mike City) on JoJo's JoJo know how to build a disc brimming with sizzling hooks too. The prototype this time? Xtina, with her over-the-top melismatic delivery. Too bad, since many of these otherwise engagingly gritty R&B tracks, especially the euphoric 'Happy Song,' out-sass recent material by grown-up divas like Monica, Tamia, and even Mary J. Blige. Though the 13-year-old's vocal calisthenics quickly grow tiresome, with a few more years under her belt JoJo may yet discover her inner soul singer." Slant Magazine gave the album a mixed review, stating, "But while the girl's certainly got pipes, her eponymous debut is as contrived and calculated as the strategic tears in the t-shirt and cap she sports on the album's cover. Even the songs JoJo penned herself can't give the disc the personality it so desperately needs; 'Keep On Keepin' On' is a 'personal,' inspirational tune, but it's high-end sneakers and a duplex that JoJo wants, a sad reminder of how success is measured by today's young people—as dictated by hip-hop trends and MTV's Cribs. Then again, it's not surprising coming from a girl who got her start on Bill Cosby's Kids Say the Darndest Things. It's not the catchy lead single 'Leave (Get Out),' produced by Soulshock and Karlin, or even a cover of SWV's early-90s hit 'Weak' that keeps JoJo afloat, but—despite lyrics like "I'm on a high/Feel like I'm on medication"—the old-school "City Lights" and the minimalist "The Happy Song," which let JoJo's vocals take center stage. As long as she surrounds herself with smarter people (and stops rhyming words like "breezy" with "heezy," as she does on the album's opening track), the young up-and-comer could very well be the next Teena Marie. But probably not."

Yahoo! Music also gave the album a mixed review when they reviewed it, commenting, "JoJo is mercilessly multi-tracked a la J.Lo, her voice encoded flatteringly as she too-many-notes her way through a succession of R'n'B beats and hooks that owe everything to studio wizardry and little to simple songwriting. Inevitably, she's 'Not That Kinda Girl' and boys 'make me happy' but friends are where it's at. In short, she only has as much to say as the Spice Girls' 'Wannabe', but does so across 14 largely forgettable tracks of scales and curlicues that make Mariah sound restrained. Discovered, like Charlotte Church, via a series of serendipitous TV appearances, JoJo's talent is less apparent. She's evidently superior to your typical schoolgirl belting out ringtones on the bus - and in Number Two hit 'Leave (Get Out)' she has a signature song solid enough to base a career on - but beyond that she has no identity to speak of. Her album wouldn't disgrace the memory of deceased label mate Aaliyah but that's to the credit of Blackground Records rather than JoJo herself. Too young to have experienced life, too polished to have any soul to her sound, thus far she's a prodigy without purpose. Let the mood swings commence!"

Commercial performance
JoJo debuted at number four on the Billboard 200, selling 95,000 copies in its first week. The album was certified platinum by the Recording Industry Association of America (RIAA) on November 15, 2004 for sales exceeding one million copies. As of October 2006 the album has sold 1.3 million copies according to Nielsen Soundscan. In Canada the album reached number 23 on the Canadian Albums Chart and was certified Platinum by Music Canada for shipments in excess of 100,000 copies.

In the United Kingdom, the album debuted and peaked at number 23 on the UK Albums Chart, and was certified gold by the British Phonographic Industry (BPI) on November 5, 2004, denoting shipments in excess of 100,000 copies. It debuted and peaked at number 52 in Germany, eventually receiving a gold certification by the Bundesverband Musikindustrie (BVMI). Despite the success of "Leave (Get Out)" in Australia, the album only managed to chart as high as number 86 on the ARIA Albums Chart. Elsewhere, JoJo reached the top 30 in Japan, Portugal, and Switzerland, the top 40 in New Zealand, the top 50 in Italy, and the top 70 in France and Ireland. As of August 2015, the album had sold over three million copies worldwide.

The 2018 reissue reached number 13 on Billboards R&B Album Sales chart and number 41 on the R&B/Hip-Hop Album Sales chart for the issue dated January 5, 2019.

Track listing

Notes
  signifies an additional producer
  signifies a co-producer

Sample credits
 "Breezy" contains replayed elements from "Something for Nothing" by MFSB.
 "Homeboy" contains elements from "Chasing Me into Somebody Else's Arms" by Scherrie Payne.
 "Use My Shoulder" contains replayed elements from "Happy" by Surface.

Personnel
Credits adapted from the liner notes of JoJo.

Musicians

 JoJo – vocals
 The Underdogs – all music 
 Bink! – all music, programming 
 Soulshock and Karlin – arrangement, all instruments 
 Eric Jackson – guitar 
 Sean Hurley – guitar 
 Michael Thompson – guitar

Technical

 Kwamé "K1 Mill" – production 
 Eric Schlotzer – recording 
 Jermaine Fray – recording assistance 
 Dexter Simmons – mixing ; additional production 
 Vincent Herbert – mixing ; production ; additional production ; executive production
 Donnie Whittemore – mixing assistance 
 The Underdogs – production 
 Dave "Natural Love" Russell – recording, editing, mixing 
 Dabling "Hobby Boy" Harward – recording, editing 
 Kevin Mahoney – recording assistance, editing assistance 
 The Co-Stars – production 
 Balewa Muhammad – production 
 Franny Graham – recording 
 Mike City – production 
 Bink! – production 
 Reggie Burrell – production 
 Ronald Burrell – production 
 Soulshock and Karlin – production 
 Soulshock – mixing 
 Brian Morgan – production 
 G.P. – co-production 
 Young Freak – co-production 
 Joanna Levesque – co-production 
 Tre Black – production 
 Barry Hankerson – executive production
 Jomo Hankerson – executive production
 Gene Grimaldi – mastering

Artwork
 Stacey "Swade" Wade – art direction, design, photography
 Thomas Delisle – photography

Charts

Weekly charts

Year-end charts

Certifications

Release history

JoJo (2018)

On December 20, 2018, JoJo re-recorded JoJo, along with her second album The High Road and singles "Demonstrate" and "Disaster", released under JoJo's new label imprint Clover Music on December 21. The decision to re-record the singles and albums came from the removal of all of JoJo's original music released under Blackground Records from streaming and digital selling platforms.

Blackground owns the master licensing to the original recordings and has control over their release. JoJo sought after getting the original songs and albums back online, but would never come to an agreement with the label. JoJo's lawyer stated they had reached the end of the statute of limitations on the re-record clause which gave her the rights to "cover" her own music.

Despite the releases of the original versions of JoJo and The High Road on digital and streaming platforms in 2021, JoJo stated that she does not benefit financially from the releases, and encourages fans to support the re-recorded versions instead.

Track listing
All tracks are noted as "2018".

Charts

Notes

References

2004 debut albums
Albums produced by Bink (record producer)
Albums produced by Soulshock and Karlin
Albums produced by the Underdogs (production team)
Albums recorded at Westlake Recording Studios
JoJo (singer) albums
Mercury Records albums
Universal Records albums